Recruitment metrics are a standard set of measurements used to manage and improve the process of hiring candidates into an organization. Candidates can be existing employees within an organization, people entering the workforce for the first time or employees interested in job opportunities outside their current organization.

Many recruitment metrics are used by organizations to gain valuable insights on potential candidates during the recruitment process:

 Identification of candidates, sometimes known as sourcing personnel.
 Attraction of candidates. 
 Interviewing and assessment of candidates.
 Overall process improvement of the recruiting workflow and steps.

Standard Recruitment Metrics

Speed Metrics

Quality Metrics

Productivity Metrics

Cost Metrics

Variations on Metrics
 Time based metrics can be measured in business or calendar days related to the nature of the hiring organization. Example: Hospitals may hire on weekends, so time based metrics being measured in calendar days will potentially give more insight. However, more traditional organizations are better served by measuring time based metrics with business days.

See also

References

Recruitment